An heiligen Wassern may refer to:

 An heiligen Wassern, an 1898 German-language novel by Jakob Christoph Heer
 Sacred Waters (1932 film), a German film based on the novel by Jakob Christoph Heer
 Sacred Waters (1960 film), a Swiss film based on the novel by Jakob Christoph Heer